Caenacantha is a genus of flies in the family Stratiomyidae.

Species
Caenacantha bipartita Wulp, 1885
Caenacantha liburna (Walker, 1849)
Caenacantha obesa (Walker, 1860)
Caenacantha pulchripennis (Brauer, 1882)
Caenacantha soror (Lindner, 1964)

References

Stratiomyidae
Brachycera genera
Taxa named by Frederik Maurits van der Wulp
Diptera of North America
Diptera of South America